The 2014 Winter Olympics in Sochi will be televised by a number of broadcasters throughout the world. As with previous years, Olympic Broadcasting Services will produce the world feed provided to local broadcasters for use in their coverage. In most regions, broadcast rights to the 2014 and 2016 Olympics were packaged together, but some broadcasters obtained rights to further games as well, while in Australia, the 2014 Games were offered individually after all three major networks were unable to reach a deal for both.

Broadcasters
In the United States, the 2014 Winter Olympics were the first in a US$4.38 billion contract with NBC Sports, extending its broadcast rights to the Olympic Games through 2020 (with broadcast rights to Sochi valued at US$775 million alone). As it did during the 2012 Summer Olympics (which brought strong viewership, and ultimately turned a profit of $88 million, unlike the previous Winter Olympics, which resulted in a loss of US$223 million), NBC offered live and tape-delayed coverage of events on television across its free-to-air network and a number of pay TV channels, and provided streaming of all events online and on mobile platforms to those who subscribe to the channels. ESPN and Fox Sports made competing bids for 2014 and 2016 Games only, but were outbid by NBC.

In Europe, sports marketing agency Sportfive replaced the European Broadcasting Union as the sales agency of broadcast rights to the 2014 and 2016 Olympics in 40 European countries. The IOC still separately negotiated broadcast rights in larger European countries such as the United Kingdom, where after uncertainty over whether rights to the Games could be picked up by a pay television broadcaster such as Sky Sports (but shared with a free-to-air broadcaster to comply with the laws forbidding certain major sporting events from being exclusively broadcast on pay channels), the BBC announced prior to the 2012 Summer Olympics that it would maintain exclusive rights to the Games through 2020.

In Australia, after several major commercial networks (among the only entities which can hold the rights due to similar anti-siphoning laws) pulled out of bidding on rights to both the 2014 and 2016 Games due to cost concerns (which included Nine Network, who had lost AUD$22 million on its joint coverage of the 2012 Games with Foxtel, and Seven Network, whose bid was rejected for being lower than what Nine/Foxtel paid), the IOC awarded broadcast rights to the 2014 Winter Olympics to Network Ten for AUD$20 million; a fraction of the amount paid by Nine and Foxtel for their own coverage.

In Canada, where the 2010 and 2012 Games were broadcast by a consortium of Bell Media and Rogers Media properties, the Canadian Broadcasting Corporation announced in August 2012 that it had acquired the Canadian broadcast rights to the 2014 and 2016 Games, returning the Olympics to CBC Television and Ici Radio-Canada Télé for the first time since 2008. While financial details were not announced, the CBC did state that it was a "financially and fiscally responsible bid", which would carry on the organization's 60-year history of Olympic broadcasting. The CBC sub-licensed pay TV rights to TSN and Sportsnet (who served as the primary channels for pay TV coverage during the previous arrangement) in English, along with Réseau des sports and TVA Sports in French.

IMG acquired the rights for in-flight and in-ship markets.

Notes

References

2014 Winter Olympics broadcasters
2014
Olympics on Canadian television
Olympics on United States television
Broadcasters